The Fairey Gannet is a carrier-borne aircraft that was designed and produced by the British aircraft manufacturer the Fairey Aviation Company. It was developed for the Royal Navy, being the first fixed-wing aircraft to combine both the search and strike portions of anti-submarine warfare (ASW) operations to be operated by the Fleet Air Arm (FAA).

The Gannet was originally developed to meet a Second World War era requirement for a dual-role ASW and strike to equip the FAA. It was a mid-wing monoplane with a tricycle undercarriage and a crew of three, with a double turboprop engine driving two contra-rotating propellers. On 19 September 1949, the prototype Gannet performed its maiden flight. Four years later, it was brought into regular service with the FAA. The service would use the type from the majority of its aircraft carriers throughout the Cold War. Various export customers were also secured for the Gannet, including the Royal Australian Navy, the German Navy, and the Indonesian Navy, most of these operating the aircraft exclusively from landbases.

During the 1960s, the Royal Navy transitioned to using helicopters, such as the Westland Whirlwind HAS.7, for ASW operations. Accordingly, several Gannets were adapted to perform alternative operations, such as an airborne electronic countermeasures platform and carrier onboard delivery aircraft. Perhaps the most extensive variant of the type was the Gannet AEW.3, which was developed as a carrier-based airborne early warning platform and was operated exclusively by the FAA. The service disposed of its Gannets on 15 December 1978, roughly aligning with the withdrawal of the last of the Royal Navy's large fleet carriers.

Development

Background
According to the aviation historian H. A. Taylor, the origins of what would become the Gannet can be traced back to 1935, when the Fairey Aviation Company started development of the unsuccessful Fairey Prince that used an unusual twin-engine arrangement. Formal design work on the Gannet commenced in response to the issuing of requirement GR.17/45 in 1945, under which the Admiralty sought a new twin-seat aircraft capable of performing both anti-submarine warfare (ASW) and strike missions. Two rival aircraft manufacturers, Fairey and Blackburn Aircraft, opted to produce responses. Fairey's submission was known as the Type Q or Fairey 17 (these designations being sources from the naming of the requirement), while Blackburn's was the Blackburn B-54 / B-88.

For 18 months, Fairey investigated the use of a single Rolls-Royce Tweed turboprop engine to power their proposed aircraft, however, this option was discontinued to concentrate on other efforts. Instead, Fairey approach the engine manufacturer Armstrong Siddeley to develop a new engine based on the existing Armstrong Siddeley Mamba turboprop; the Double Mamba (otherwise known as the "Twin Mamba"). This engine basically comprised a pair of Mamba engines that were mounted side-by-side and sharing a common gearbox. The proposal was enthusiastically accepted and formal design work on the engine stated in December 1945.

The acceptance of this proposal enabled Fairey to develop a rather atypical propulsion arrangement for their proposed aircraft, which was normally only possible for a single engined aircraft. Via the use of a pair of coaxial contra-rotating propellers fitted on the nose of the aircraft, various advantages were presented over conventional twin-engine counterparts; one engine could be shut down and its propellers feathered without producing asymmetry and therefore control difficulties. Shutting down one of the two engines in flight would reduce fuel consumption and extend the aircraft's range.

On 12 August 1946, Fairey was awarded an initial contract to produce two prototypes; Blackburn also received a competing contract to built its own prototypes. One reason for the ordering of multiple prototypes was so that alternative engines, such as the Napier Nomad, could be test flown, although some of these alternatives would next actually be fitted. Another reason was the relatively radical engine arrangement and the high proportion of original design features incorporated into the aircraft.

Into flight
On 19 September 1949, the prototype performed its maiden flight from Aldermaston outside Reading, flown by R. G. Slate; this milestone occurred ten months ahead of Blackburn's competing prototype. While some elements of the prototype proved relatively trouble-free, such as the Double Mamba engine, several early test flights had been troubled by flight control difficulties. These issues, such as sharp trim changes, did not delay the next stage of testing, which commenced in November of that year at Fairey's White Waltham facility. On 25 November 1949, the prototype crash-landed during an unstable landing, leading to three months of repairs.

On 1 March 1950, flight testing resumed with the repaired prototype. By this point, several of the handling issues had been appropriately remedied along with several other faults, yet difficulties with holding the nosewheel up during landings remained. Two months later, sufficient progress had been made to proceed with a formal assessment by naval test pilots at RAF Boscombe Down as well as to begun preliminary carrier trials.

On 6 July 1950, the second prototype took to the skies, joining the flight test shortly thereafter. As a result of changes to the operational requirements, this aircraft featured numerous changes from the first prototype, such as a third canopy for an additional crew member and an extended bomb bay. To accommodate the latter, the radar randome had to be repositioned rearwards; the first prototype was modified to reflect these changes for the aerodynamic trials.

In May 1952, the first prototype returned to Boscombe Down to conduct deck landing assessments and trials, having been configured to represent a production-standard aircraft by this point. Changes included the repositioning of the main landing legs rearwards by 12 inches. Following a full series of handling trials, further carrier trials were performed aboard . On 13 March 1951, Fairey received an initial over for 100 Gannet AS.1s from the British Government; this had been placed as a 'super-priority' on account of the Korean War. In 1953, quantity production of the type commenced.

On 9 June 1953, the first production Gannet performed its initial flight from RAF Northolt and was put to work in the latter stages of the flight test programme. One serious flaw encountered during the later stage of trials was instances of compressor stalls, the type was grounded for two months while the propeller control system was modified accordingly. One early production aircraft appeared at the 1953 Society of British Aerospace Companies (SBAC) display at Farnborough. On 5 April 1954, four Gannets were formally handed over to the FAA at RNAS Ford.

Further development
The development of several variants of the Gannet started relatively early. On 16 August 1954, the first Gannet T.2, a dedicated trainer variant made its initial flight; it was furnished with dual controls in the forward cockpits, with a retractable periscope for the second cockpit, while the radar apparatus and scanner equipment were deleted. Production of the Gannet was shared between Fairey's factories at Hayes, Middlesex and Heaton Chapel, Stockport / Manchester (Ringway) Airport. During 1954, production commenced at Heaton Chapel, the first aircraft from this production line flew on 5 October of that year. That same month, tropical trials were conducted in Khartoum.

During the late 1950s, an improved ASW model, the Gannet AS.4, and its T.5 trainer equivalent were developed. The improvements included the fitting of an up-rated Double Mamba engine. Several were refurbished with new electronics and radar, thus were re-designated Gannet AS.6.

During 1958, the Gannet was selected to replace the Douglas Skyraider in the airborne early warning and control (AEW) role. In order to accommodate the systems required for this new mission, the Gannet underwent a significant redesign that saw a new version of the Double Mamba installed, new radome mounted under the aircraft, the tailfin increased in area, the undercarriage lengthened and the weapons bay removed. A total of 44 aircraft (plus a single prototype) of the AEW.3 version were produced.

Design

The Fairey Gannet is a carrier-borne turboprop-powered aircraft. It was typically operated by a crew of three, a pilot and two aerial observers. The pilot was seated directly above the aircraft's Double Mamba engine and behind the gearbox and contrarotating propellers in a position that conferred a favourable view over the nose for carrier operations. The first observer was seated underneath a separate canopy that was directly aft of the pilot's position. On the production aircraft, a second observer was also present in their own cockpit that was located over the wing trailing edge. This addition disturbed the airflow over the horizontal stabiliser, necessitating the addition of small finlets on either side.

The wing of the Gannet folded in two places, forming a distinctive Z-shape on each side, to minimise its space requirements while being stowed onboard aircraft carriers. The first fold was upwards, at about a third of the wing span where the inboard anhedral (down-sweep) changed to the outboard  dihedral (up-sweep) of the wing (described as an inverted gull wing). The second wing fold was downward, at about two-thirds of the wing span. The length of the nosewheel shock absorber caused the Gannet to have a distinctive nose-high attitude, which was a common characteristic of carrier aircraft of the era.

The Gannet had a sizable internal bomb bay within the fuselage; it was the first British aircraft in FAA service to be capable of storing all its munitions (other than rockets) within an internal bomb bay. Such munitions could include depth charges, sonobouys, homing torpedoes, bombs, markers, and mines. Hard points beneath the outer wings could carry up to 16 Mk.8 or 24 Mk.5 rocket projectiles; other equipment included 100 gallon external fuel tanks. The primary search apparatus was the Air-to-Surface Vessel (ASV) radar, which made use of a retractable radome positioned underneath the rear fuselage just to the aft of the bomb bay.

The Armstrong Siddeley Double Mamba engine consisted of two Mamba engines that were mounted in a side-by-side arrangement and coupled through a common gearbox to coaxial contra-rotating propellers. Each engine drove its own propeller, and power was transmitted by a torsion shaft which was engaged through a series of sun, planet, epicyclic and spur gears to give a suitable reduction ratio and correct propeller-shaft rotation. The ASMD.1 engine (2,950 hp/2,200 kW) was used in the Gannet AS.1; ASMD.3 (3,145 hp/2,345 kW) in the AS.4; and ASMD.4 (3,875 hp/2,889 kW) in the AEW.3 variant. The Double Mamba engine could be run with one Mamba stopped and its propeller feathered, to conserve fuel and extend endurance when cruising; stopping one engine on a conventional twin-engined plane would normally create thrust asymmetry, whereas the centerline-mounted propeller arrangement avoided this. The Mamba exhausts were situated on each side of the fuselage, at the root of the wing trailing edge. The gas-turbine engine could run on kerosene, "wide-cut" turbine fuel or diesel fuel, allowing the Admiralty to eliminate the dangerous high-octane petroleum spirit required to operate piston-engined aircraft from carriers. 

In FAA service, the Gannet generally wore the standard camouflage scheme of a Sky (duck-egg blue) underside and fuselage sides, with Extra Dark Sea Grey upper surfaces, the fuselage demarcation line running from the nose behind the propeller spinner in a straight line to then curve and join the line of the fin. Code numbers were typically painted on the side of the fuselage ahead of the wing; roundel and serial markings were behind the wing. The T.2 and T.5 trainers were finished in silver overall, with a yellow "Trainer band" on rear fuselage and wings.

Operational history
During April 1954, initial deliveries of the Gannet AS.1, the initial variant, formally commenced. On 17 January 1955, the 826 NAS became the RN's first operational Gannet squadron, which promptly embarked on the newly modernised aircraft carrier . During its initial at-sea deployment in the Mediterranean, no serious issues were encountered with the Gannet aside from the standard teething issues. Later that same year, the Royal Australian Navy (RAN) stood up their first two Gannet squadrons.

The RAN ultimately operated 33 Gannet AS.1 and three T.2 trainers. They were primarily flown from the aircraft carrier  as well as the shore base  near Nowra, New South Wales. During 1967, the RAN withdrew its surviving 24 Gannets from service.

By the mid-1960s, the Royal Navy's Gannet AS.1 and AS.4 models had been replaced by the Westland Whirlwind HAS.7 helicopters. FAA Gannets continued to be operated as electronic countermeasures (ECM) aircraft: the ECM.6. Several Gannet AS.4s were converted to COD.4s for Carrier onboard delivery—the aerial supply of mail and light cargo to the fleet.

Starting in May 1958, West Germany's Navy commenced operations of the Gannet AS.4; the country would obtain 15 Gannet AS.4s and a single T.5 in total. German Gannets operated as the ASW squadron of Marinefliegergeschwader 2 (2nd Naval Aviation Wing) from Jagel and Sylt. During 1963, the squadron was reassigned to MFG 3 at Nordholz Naval Airbase, where they remained until the type were entirely replaced by the newer and larger Breguet Br.1150 Atlantic three years later.

During January 1959, Indonesia ordered an initial 18 Gannet AS.4 and T.5s for the Indonesian Navy. These were purchased from Fairey via the Ministry of Supply and were re-modelled from existing Gannet AS.1s and T.2s prior to delivery. Several were used as ground-based trainers only. Additional Gannets were later acquired by various other countries.

Accidents and mishaps
 21 November 1958 – Fairey Gannet AS.1, WN345, suffered a belly landing during a test programme, caused by a partially retracted nosewheel. The pilot tried unsuccessfully to get the gear to deploy. He landed gear-up on a foam-covered runway at RAF Bitteswell, suffering minimal damage. After repair, the Gannet was back in the air within weeks.
 30 January 1959 - A Royal Australian Navy Gannet on a trip from Bankstown to Nowra broke up in mid-flight over the Sydney suburb of Sylvania, killing pilot Lieutenant PJ Arnold.
 29 July 1959 – Royal Navy Fairey Gannet AS.4, XA465, could not lower the undercarriage, made a power-on deck belly landing into the crash barrier on HMS Centaur. The crew was uninjured but the airframe was written off, salvaged in Singapore, but ending up at the fire dump of Singapore Naval Base.
 9 April 1962 - Two Fairey Gannet AEW.3s of 849 Sqn FAA RN (XL499 "426" and XP197 "414") collided at night and crashed into the English Channel 15 miles off The Lizard, Cornwall. All six crew were killed:
 23 January 1964 – Royal Navy Fairey Gannet ECM.6 XG832 suffered double engine failure caused by a phosphor bronze bushing on the idler gear of the port engine's primary accessory drive failing. Fine metal particles from the gear were carried away by the shared oil system of the two engines, causing both to be destroyed. All three crew bailed out near St Austell and survived.
 12 May 1966 – German Navy AS.4 UA-115 crashed shortly after takeoff from Kaufbeuren, killing all three crew members. The crash was deemed the result of pilot error.

Harness restraint issues
Tests on the harness restraint system in the Gannet were carried out after a midflight failure due to the release cables binding. The accident was the result of an unrelated engine failure, but the primary issue was the failure of the harness quick-release mechanism.

A brief report in Cockpit, Q4 1973, concerning the accident:

Variants

Operators

Fleet Air Arm
724 Squadron RAN
725 Squadron RAN
816 Squadron RAN
817 Squadron RAN

Marineflieger
Marinefliegergeschwader 2 (1958–63)
Marinefliegergeschwader 3 (1963–66)

Indonesian Navy Naval Aviation

Royal Navy Fleet Air Arm
700 Naval Air Squadron
703 Naval Air Squadron
703X Flight
719 Naval Air Squadron
724 Naval Air Squadron
725 Naval Air Squadron
728 Naval Air Squadron
737 Naval Air Squadron
744 Naval Air Squadron
796 Naval Air Squadron
810 Naval Air Squadron
812 Naval Air Squadron
814 Naval Air Squadron
815 Naval Air Squadron
816 Naval Air Squadron
817 Naval Air Squadron
820 Naval Air Squadron
824 Naval Air Squadron
825 Naval Air Squadron
826 Naval Air Squadron
831 Naval Air Squadron
847 Naval Air Squadron
849 Naval Air Squadron
1840 Naval Air Squadron Royal Naval Volunteer Reserve

Surviving aircraft

Australia
On display
 Gannet AS.1 XA334, Camden Museum of Aviation, New South Wales
 Gannet AS.1 XA331, Queensland Air Museum, Caloundra, Queensland.
 Gannet AS.1 XA434 at the Fleet Air Arm Museum, Nowra, New South Wales
 Gannet AS.1 XG789 the Australian National Aviation Museum, Moorabbin, Victoria.
 Gannet T.5 XG888  at the Fleet Air Arm Museum, Nowra, New South Wales

Germany
On display
 Gannet AEW.3 XL450, at the Flugausstellung Hermeskeil.
 Gannet AS.4 UA-113, at the Aeronauticum Marinefliegermuseum Nordholz e.V
 Gannet AS.4 UA-112 at the Technik Museum Speyer
 Gannet AS.4 UA-110 painted as UA-106  at Militärhistorisches Museum Flugplatz Berlin-Gatow

Indonesia
On display
 Gannet AS.1, Serial no. AS07 painted as AS101 at Juanda Naval Air Station in Surabaya.
 Gannet AS.1, Serial no. AS05 painted as AS105 at Bumi Moro Museum TNI-AL Loka Jala Crana in Surabaya.  
 Gannet AS.1, Serial no. AS00 at Satria Mandala Armed Forces Museum in Jakarta.

United Kingdom
On display
 Gannet COD.4 XA466 at the Fleet Air Arm Museum, RNAS Yeovilton
 Gannet T.2 XA508, Midland Air Museum, Coventry
 Gannet T.5 XG883, Museum of Berkshire Aviation, Woodley, Berkshire, England
 Gannet ECM.6 XG831 at Davidstow Airfield and Cornwall at War Museum, Cornwall.
 Gannet ECM.6 XA459 at Solway Aviation Museum, England
 Gannet ECM.6 XG797 at the Imperial War Museum at Duxford Airfield, Cambridgeshire
 Gannet AEW.3 XL497 at the Dumfries and Galloway Aviation Museum, Scotland
 Gannet AEW.3 XL502 at Yorkshire Air Museum, England
 Gannet AEW.3 XL503 at the Fleet Air Arm Museum, RNAS Yeovilton
 Gannet AEW.3 XP226 at the Newark Air Museum, England
Under restoration or stored
 Gannet AS.4 XA460 currently under restoration at the Ulster Aviation Museum, Lisburn, Northern Ireland
 Gannet T.5 XG882 is on the former RAF Errol, between Dundee and Perth, Scotland; however, the aircraft is unprotected and is derelict
 Gannet AEW.3 G-KAEW (XL500) undergoing a full restoration to airworthiness at South Wales Aviation Museum (SWAM), former RAF St Athan site at Picketston, near Cardiff

United States
Airworthy
 Gannet T.5 XT752, Wings of Steel Foundation, Wisconsin

On Display
 Gannet AEW3 XL482 at the Pima Air Museum, Arizona

Specifications (Gannet AS.1)

See also

References

Citations

Bibliography
 
 Gibson, Chris. The Admiralty and AEW. Project Tech Profiles, 2011, .
 Smith, Dave. "Hit The Deck." Flypast, No. 328, November 2008.
 Sturtivant, Ray and Theo Ballance. The Squadrons of the Fleet Air Arm. London: Air-Britain, 1994. .
 Taylor, H.A. Fairey Aircraft Since 1915. London: Putnam, 1974. .
 Taylor, John W.R. "Fairey Gannet". Combat Aircraft of the World from 1909 to the Present. New York: G.P. Putnam's Sons, 1969 (reprinted 1977). , .
 Thetford, Owen. British Naval Aircraft Since 1912. London: Putnam, 1978. .
 Velek, Martin, Michal Ovčáčík and Karel Susa. Fairey Gannet Anti-submarine and Strike Variants, AS Mk.1 & AS Mk.4 . Prague, Czech Republic: 4+ Publications, 2007. .
 Williams, Ray. Fly Navy: Aircraft of the Fleet Air Arm Since 1945. London: Airlife Publishing, 1989. .
 Willis, David. "Fairey's Versatile Gannet – Part Two", Air Enthusiast, Number 124, July–August 2006.

External links

 List of surviving Gannets
 "XT752: The world's last flying Fairey Gannet T5"

Aircraft with contra-rotating propellers
1940s British anti-submarine aircraft
Carrier-based aircraft
Gannet
Inverted gull-wing aircraft
Single-engined tractor aircraft
Single-engined turboprop aircraft
Mid-wing aircraft
Aircraft first flown in 1949